Glimps Holm or Glims Holm is a small uninhabited islet in Orkney, Scotland.

Geography
Glimps Holm lies in Holm Sound, one of the eastern entrances to Scapa Flow, between Mainland, Orkney and the island of Burray. The Churchill Barriers link South Ronaldsay to the Orkney Mainland. Glimps Holm is connected to Lamb Holm, to the northeast, by Barrier number 2, and to Burray by Barrier number 3.

History
Scapa Flow had many entrances, making it difficult to protect the anchorages in this natural harbour. Blockships had been sunk to close the narrow passages, but these proved inadequate. The Churchill Barriers were built during World War II to block the eastern entrances. Much of the labour for the causeways was provided by over 1300 Italian prisoners of war, captured in North Africa and stationed in Camp 60 on Lamb Holm and two camps on Burray.

Footnotes

Uninhabited islands of Orkney